Irving Klaw Trio was an American experimental rock group formed in Olympia, Washington in the 1990s.

The band, named after Irving Klaw, was started when founding members Jeff Fuccillo, Jason Funk and Andrew Price met at the Evergreen State College. Later the group added saxophonist Ryan Polous but retained the "trio" name. Early recordings were influential lo-fi recordings released on numerous underground cassette tape labels such as Shrimper, Union Pole, Chocolate Monk and Catsup Plate. Later recordings were more refined and drew from a variety of influences including free jazz, space-rock and world music.

Jeff Fuccillo and Jason Funk now play in the Japanese improvisational band Helll. Andrew Price is a member of Hungry Ghost.

Discography 
Irving Klaw Trio, this self-titled album was released on the Silly Bird label on March 29, 1996.
Utek Pahtoo Mogoi, released on the Road Cone label on May 15, 1997.

Independent reviews

References

External links 
Allmusic profile
MySpace profile

American experimental rock groups
Musical groups established in the 1990s
Rock music groups from Washington (state)
Musical groups from Olympia, Washington
Shrimper Records artists